Mega Man X7, known as  in Japan, is a video game developed by Capcom for the PlayStation 2 console. It is the seventh main game in the Mega Man X series and the first in the series to appear on the sixth generation of gaming consoles. Mega Man X7 was first released in Japan on July 17, 2003, with North American and European releases following in October 2003 and March 2004 respectively. The European version features a redrawn logo also used for future releases in the region. It was also released for Microsoft Windows exclusively in South Korea and Taiwan until the re-release as part of Mega Man X Legacy Collection 2 (Rockman X Anniversary Collection 2 in Japan) on July 24, 2018 for the worldwide release and July 26, 2018 for Japan, whose Windows version was released internationally via Steam along with PlayStation 4, Xbox One and Nintendo Switch. It is the first and only Mega Man X game to be a third-person shooter (as well as the third Mega Man game to use third-person view due to the Mega Man Legends franchise).

Mega Man X7 takes place in the 22nd century. Daily human life is often disrupted by "Maverick" crime from the "Reploids" robots that live and work among them. The heroic "Maverick Hunter" X has retired from the battlefield. As such, various groups have begun springing up to stamp out the ever constant threat of Maverick activity. Axl, a member of "Red Alert", questions his group's methods and deserts the team, only to be pursued by its leader, Red. Like other games in the series, Mega Man X7 is an action-platform game in which the player fights through an octet of selectable stages. The game differs from previous side-scrolling entries by featuring fully 3D graphics intermixed with both 3D and 2D gameplay.

The development of Mega Man X7 involved a challenging transition of the well-known Mega Man X characters into 3D. However, the reinvention of the series in both graphical and gameplay respects was met with a hostile critical reception. Reviewers found the game's foray into the third dimension well-intended but poorly executed.

Plot

Following the Eurasia and Nightmare incidents, Reploids work diligently to rebuild the Earth. Growing weary of the seemingly never-ending Maverick Wars, X decides to retire in search of more peaceful solutions, leaving Zero in charge. In X's absence, Maverick activity rapidly begins to rise, which leads to the formation of an unsanctioned anti-Maverick vigilante group known as Red Alert. As the group grows more and more reckless, one of their members, a new generation Reploid prototype named Axl, decides to defect. Red, the group's leader, is angered by Axl deserting them and goes on a rampage to get him back.

Axl is chased through a city by a mechaniloid sent by Red Alert to retrieve him, and the ensuing chaos draws the attention of Zero. After a battle against the mechaniloid, Zero takes Axl into custody at Maverick Hunter HQ. In response, Red issues a challenge to the Hunters: he will release some Mavericks that Red Alert has in captivity, and whichever group can defeat the Mavericks first will gain possession of Axl. Zero goes into action without hesitation and Axl's remorse for what he has done fuels his desire to become a Maverick Hunter.  As Zero and Axl battle Red Alert, Axl reveals that he possesses the ability to copy the DNA of other Reploids, making him invaluable to Red. X initially stays out of the conflict, feeling that it is pointless, but later joins in hoping to end the war quickly. Elsewhere, Red communicates with a mysterious figure known as "The Professor," who gives him additional power and shows him what Axl's copy ability can do.  The Professor then takes possession of Red Alert, and orders Red to retrieve Axl.

Following the defeat of the Mavericks, the Hunters infiltrate Crimson Palace, the home base of Red Alert. There they defeat a reluctant Red and discover a rebuilt Sigma, who was behind Red Alert's corruption. Despite the Hunters defeating Sigma twice, he rises once again and punches Axl through a wall, before vowing to X and Zero that he will again return. Suddenly, Red reappears and Sigma attempts to possess him, but it turns out to be Axl (copying Red's DNA), who then proceeds to blast Sigma out of a window from the top of the palace.

The ending of the game depends on which character was used to defeat Sigma:
 In X's ending, X adamantly refuses to train Axl to become a Maverick Hunter, thinking he is too young and immature. Signas tries to reason with X, warning him that they have not seen the last of the Mavericks.
 Axl's ending shows him arguing with X regarding his future as a Hunter. Alia interrupts to inform them of a Maverick outbreak, to which Axl runs off to deal with, much to X's displeasure.
 In Zero's ending, he has a nightmare in which X gains a strange desire to destroy all Mavericks, foreshadowing the rise of Copy X in [[Mega Man Zero (video game)|Mega Man Zero]].

Gameplay
Mega Man X7 is the first of the two games in the series to have 3D gameplay in addition to the standard 2D style. When starting the game, the player has only access to returning Maverick Hunter Zero and newcomer Axl. The player can send the two characters to the same stage and both can be changed whenever the player needs to. In order to unlock X, the player must rescue 64 reploids (out of a possible total of 128) or defeat the eight main bosses in order to unlock him. Unlike the preceding games, chips must be used immediately after they are gained and cannot be deactivated, nor changed from one playable character to another. Once all the chips for that playable character are completely maxed out, that particular character can no longer receive any more chip upgrades.

An auto-aim feature is added for both Axl and X allowing the player to lock on to enemies. The target can be changed by pressing a dedicated button. While Zero does not have any standard long-range attacks, his ability to destroy projectiles with his Z-Saber from past games was replaced to repel projectiles instead to help compensate for this weakness.

Unlike previous games, X can air dash and fully charge his buster by default. Armor capsules from Dr. Light also return, and after obtaining the full set, the player can choose between unarmored X or armored X on the Stage Select.

While Zero and X retain their common weaponry, Axl has a new ability called "Copy Shot". If the player destroys certain types of enemies with said technique, they will leave an item upon their destruction. If the item (a glowing red sphere) is picked up, Axl will transform into a copy of the enemy he destroyed, with all of its features (speed, weapon, etc.).

The game also has a New Game Plus feature, by completing the game and saving it, and then starting a new game from loading that particular save file. This feature allows for X to become available after the opening stage with any collected armor parts kept and all the chip upgrades from the previous game are retained.

Development
Mega Man X7 was developed by a team of about 30 people, led by producers Tatsuya Minami and Tatsuya Kitabayashi of Capcom Production Studio 3. This was the first game in the Mega Man series worked on by Kitabayashi. He explained that transitioning the character models of Mega Man X from 2D to 3D graphics was a challenge, but that including both 2D and 3D gameplay was not, as they had planned to have them in equal amounts for the game. The development team took into account the less-than-favorable reception for Mega Man X6, but instead of simply trying to make the next game new and fresh with 3D graphics, they decided to focus on "getting 3D right". The team also attempted to build upon the action-style gameplay for which the Mega Man franchise is known along with the more adult-themed storyline of the Mega Man X series. This involved adding the newer, non-traditional character Axl to deepen and better the narrative. Kitabayashi emphasized, "He's young, he's running away. He's like the new younger character of the group, and that's why I wanted to put him in there." Minami stated in an interview that the game would feature multiplayer for up to two players. However, the final version of the game lacks this option.

Prominent Mega Man artist and Capcom producer Keiji Inafune had little involvement in the Mega Man X series after the fifth installment. His only contribution to Mega Man X7 was lending advice to the illustrators on creating the new protagonist Axl. Inafune had been careful to make X and Zero unique when he originally designed them, and he wanted to give Axl the same treatment. The game's primary artist, Tatsuya Yoshikawa, signed on when the project was well underway. He decided to take after his predecessor Haruki Suetsugu for the direction in which to design the characters. Yoshikawa thought the team would have to create "polygon friendly" bosses, but decided to stick to the traditional design concepts set forth by the early Mega Man X games. As the series had finally transitioned into 3D, Yoshikawa also expected the team to rethink the way the game was made as they had done in the first Mega Man X title. Inafune stated, "My personal opinion was that 3D is simply a graphical style, and just because a game is going 3D like X7 was, it doesn't mean we 'have to' make it a 3D game.

The musical score for Mega Man X7 was composed by nine individuals. A 46-song soundtrack was released by Suleputer in Japan on October 1, 2003. The game's opening theme, "Code Crush", is performed by Rina Aiuchi. The ending theme is "Lazy Mind", performed by Showtaro Morikubo, the voice actor for X in the Japanese games. A CD single for each of the songs was released in Japan on July 20, 2003 and August 6, 2003 respectively.

Reception

Mega Man X7 debuted on Japanese sales charts as the third best-selling video game at copies. By its second week on sale, the game had sold 71,739 copies in the region and by its third week, 89,775 copies. Media Create sales data lists the game as having sold 111,778 copies by the end of 2003 in Japan. A budget re-release of the game was included alongside the PlayStation versions of the first six original Mega Man games as part of the Rockman Collection in Japan on December 19, 2003.

Mega Man X7 received mixed reviews. While it attracted some positive remarks for the character switching and Reploid rescue systems, the general consensus was that the game's mixture of 2D and 3D gameplay was well-intentioned but poorly executed. IGN found the characters unbalanced as the shooters X and Axl felt far more useful than the melee fighter Zero. In particular, critics commented that the camera and controls do not translate well from 2D to 3D. Criticism has been aimed at the English voice actors' performance, to the point that it has been recommended to try listening to the original Japanese audio. The music has been described as generic and, while appealing, it does not stand out against what previous installments have offered.

GameSpy concluded "I can't fault Capcom or the MMX7 team for trying to reinvent a series that had obviously completely lost its way... [but] the flaccid 2D sections in this game aren't half as good as any of the levels in the original Mega Man X. The 3D bits are more compelling, but still substandard." IGN instead placed the blame wholly on the 3D sections: "We can't help but think that Mega Man X7 would have been better-suited staying 2D. But until Capcom realizes that the better action-oriented 3D titles allow you to manipulate the camera whole-heartedly, future installments of the series will likely run into the same problems that this one did."

In a retrospective article involving the franchise's worst games, 1UP.com included Mega Man X7 citing "usual 3D design issues" and the titular character requiring to be unlocked as the game's flaws. GamesRadar compared it with the similarly poor received Castlevania for the Nintendo 64 due to how both games tried staying away from their predecessors' formula by adding 3D gameplay and the transition failed to gamers.

References

External links

Official website 

 

2003 video games
Mega Man X games
PlayStation 2 games
PlayStation 4 games
Nintendo Switch games
Xbox One games
Fiction about rebellions
Video games developed in Japan
Video games set in Algeria
Video games set in Angola
Video games set in Canada
Video games set in India
Video games set in Japan
Video games set in Russia
Video game sequels
Video games scored by Noriyuki Iwadare
Video games with 2.5D graphics
Video games with cel-shaded animation
Windows games
Superhero video games